Endless Flight: The Life of Joseph Roth is a 2022 book by Keiron Pim that examines the life of Joseph Roth. The book has five "positive" reviews and five "rave" reviews, according to review aggregator Book Marks.

References

2022 non-fiction books
English-language books
Granta Books books